The 2021 Nova Scotia Liberal Party leadership election took place on February 6 to elect a leader to replace Premier Stephen McNeil, who on August 6, 2020, announced his pending resignation after leading the party since 2007 and returning the party to government in 2013 after being out of power for fourteen years.

Background

Stephen McNeil announced on August 6, 2020, pending resignation as party leader and premier, during the COVID-19 pandemic in Nova Scotia. McNeil remained as Premier and leader until the new leader was chosen.

Timeline

2020
August 6 – Stephen McNeil announces his pending resignation as Premier of Nova Scotia and leader of the Nova Scotia Liberal Party.
August 22 – The party unveils the base set of rules for the election.
September 14 – The official rules for the leadership election will be released.
September 30 – Labi Kousoulis declares his candidacy.
October 5 – Iain Rankin declares his candidacy.
October 8 – Randy Delorey declares his candidacy.
October 9 – Last day to register as a candidate.

2021
January 7 – Last day to become an eligible party member.

Candidates

Declared

Randy Delorey

Randy Delorey was the MLA for Antigonish, having served since 2013. Prior to announcing his candidacy, Delorey had been serving as Minister of Gaelic Affairs since 2013 and the Minister of Health and Wellness since 2017. Previously, he has served as the Minister of the Environment (2013–2015; 2015–2016) and as Minister of Finance and Treasury Board (2015–2017).

Candidacy announced: October 9, 2020
Date registered with Elections Nova Scotia:
Campaign website: 

Policies

Labi Kousoulis

Labi Kousoulis was the MLA for Halifax Citadel-Sable Island, having served since 2013. Additionally, he was the Minister of Labour and Advanced Education since 2017, having resigned to run in the leadership race. He previously served as the Minister of the Public Service Commission (2013–2017) and Minister of Internal Services (2014–2017).

Candidacy announced: September 30, 2020
Date registered with Elections Nova Scotia:
Campaign website: 

Policies

Iain Rankin

Iain Rankin was the MLA for Timberlea-Prospect, having served since 2013. Rankin served in cabinet as the Minister of Lands and Forestry since 2018, having resigned prior to announcing his candidacy. In addition, he previously served as Minister of Environment from 2017 to 2018 and was head of the Nova Scotia francophone parliamentarian association from 2014 to 2017.

Candidacy announced: October 5, 2020
Date registered with Elections Nova Scotia:
Campaign website: 

Policies

Declined
 Joanne Bernard, former Minister of Community Services; former MLA for Dartmouth North
 Scott Brison, former MP for Kings—Hants; former federal Minister of Public Works and Government Services; former federal President of the Treasury Board
 Bill Casey, former MP for Cumberland-Colchester (1988–1993, 1997–2009, 2015–2019), former Chair of the House of Commons Health Committee
 Zach Churchill, Minister of Education and Early Childhood Development; MLA for Yarmouth
 Sean Fraser, MP for Central Nova
 Andy Fillmore, MP for Halifax
 Laurie Graham, chief of staff to Stephen McNeil
 Bernadette Jordan, federal Minister of Fisheries, Oceans, and the Canadian Coast Guard; former federal Minister of Rural Economic Development; MP for South Shore—St. Margarets
 Geoff MacLellan, Minister of Business, Trade, and Service; MLA for Glace Bay
 Lena Metlege Diab, Minister of Immigration; MLA for Halifax Armdale
 Kelly Regan, Minister of Community Services; MLA for Bedford; wife of former Speaker of the House of Commons of Canada Geoff Regan
 Darrell Samson, federal Parliamentary Secretary to the Minister of Veterans Affairs; MP for Sackville-Preston-Chezzetcook
 Mike Savage, Mayor of Halifax; former MP for Dartmouth—Cole Harbour

Debates

Results
 = Eliminated from next round
 = Winner

References

Liberal
Liberal Party leadership eleciton
2021 elections in Canada
2021 political party leadership elections
Liberal Party leadership election